Arnoux is a surname. Notable people with the surname include:

Alexandre Arnoux, (1884–1973), French screenwriter
Cody Arnoux, American association football player
Hippolyte Arnoux (1860–1890), French photographer and publisher
Maurice Arnoux, World War I flying ace credited with five aerial victories
René Arnoux (born 1948), retired French racing driver who is a veteran of 12 Formula One seasons (1978 to 1989)
Stanley Arnoux (born 1986), American football linebacker for the New Orleans Saints of the National Football League

See also
Arnoux system, railway device invented by Jean-Claude-Républicain Arnoux in 1838
Château-Arnoux-Saint-Auban, commune in the region of Provence-Alpes-Côte d'Azur in south-eastern France
Arnous, disambiguation